Osteina is a fungal genus in the family Fomitopsidaceae. It is a monotypic genus that contains the single species Osteina obducta. The genus was circumscribed by mycologist Marinus Anton Donk in 1966, with Polyporus obductus as the type species.

Description
Osteina is characterized by fruit bodies that are sessile to stipitate, which are bone hard when dry. It has a monomitic hyphal system, containing only generative hyphae with clamps. The spores are hyaline and thin-walled, and are inamyloid and acyanophilic. Osteina causes a brown rot in gymnosperm wood.

Osteina obducta is inedible.

References

Fomitopsidaceae
Inedible fungi
Monotypic Polyporales genera
Taxa named by Marinus Anton Donk
Taxa described in 1966